Madha may refer to:

 Madha, Oman, an exclave of Oman
 Madha, Maharashtra, a city and a municipal council in Maharashtra, India
 Madha (Lok Sabha constituency)
 Madha (Vidhan Sabha constituency)
 Madha, Hissar, a village in Haryana, India
 Madha Engineering College, in Kunrathur, India
 Omar Madha, British television director